Auchmuty School is a state secondary school in the town of Glenrothes in the Fife council area of Scotland. Opened in 1957, it was the first school for secondary education in the area. It quickly outgrew the original building and additions were added in about 1970. The planning and construction of a completely new Auchmuty High School, beside the old one, began in 2011, with doors opening to pupils in 2013.

With the old buildings remaining in use until the new ones were completed, the construction began on the playing fields beside the A92 and Queensway roundabout. After completion, the old buildings were gradually demolished and new playing fields were put in place, finishing in 2014. Auchmuty's sporting facilities now include tennis courts, large playing grounds and a football pitch which is used for a wide range of sports.  The current role is around 1350 which is slightly higher than the recommended capacity for Auchmuty - a new school to replace the other two high schools in Glenrothes is currently being discussed.

Associated Schools

The Auchmuty cluster contains 8 primary schools, 2 stand alone nursery schools and one school for children with complex additional support needs. 

Primary schools -

Carleton

Coaltown of Balgonie

Markinch

Pitteuchar East

Pitteuchar West

Star of Markinch

Thornton

Warout

Nursery schools -

Carleton

Ladybird

Special school -

John Fergus

Destinations of school leavers

House system
In 2006, the present houses were introduced. The five houses are Wemyss, Balgonie, Ravenscraig, Glamis and Balmoral.

The house system associates a depute headteacher to each house and guidance teacher.

Currently the houses are -

Wemyss - Cara Kitching & Colin Bird

Balgonie - Aaron Moyes & Chris Deaves

Ravenscraig - Debbie Donnelly & Chris Deaves

Glamis - Kirsten Bennie & Steve Addison

Balmoral - Dave Lumsden & Colin Bird

Prior to 2006 there were 4 houses: Balfarg, Conland, Kilgour and Pitcairn.

Notable alumni
Dougray Scott – actor
Mark Hirst – editor-in-chief
Kevin McHattie – professional footballer

Head teachers  

David Wilson resigned in February 2009, after being arrested in December 2008 on charges of possession of child pornography. He pleaded guilty to the charges in October 2009. There is no evidence that any pupils from the school were involved.

References

External links
 Auchmuty High School page on Fife Council
 Auchmuty High School's page on Scottish Schools Online

Educational institutions established in 1957
Secondary schools in Fife
1957 establishments in Scotland
Glenrothes